263 was a year.

263 may also refer to:

Dates and numbers
263 (number)
263 BC

Military
No. 263 Squadron RAF
VMM-263, United States Marine Corps Marine Medium Tiltrotor Squadron
HMM-263, former name of VMM-263
Messerschmitt Me 263, World War II fighter aircraft
USS Benton County (LST-263), a tank landing ship from World War II
USS Laub (DD-263), destroyer from World War II, later the Royal Navy's HMS Burwell
HMCS Yukon (DDE 263), Canadian destroyer

Highways

United States
Alabama State Route 263
California State Route 263
Florida State Road 263
New York State Route 263
Pennsylvania Route 263
Virginia State Route 263

Canada
Quebec Route 263
Saskatchewan Highway 263

Miscellaneous
263 Dresda, main belt asteroid
H.263, video codec